The following is a timeline of the history of the municipality of Haarlem, Netherlands.

Prior to 18th century

 9th century CE - Haarlem founded.
 1245 - City rights bestowed upon Haarlem by William II of Holland.
 1318 - Janskerk (church) built.
 1347 - Fire.
 1370 - Grote Kerk (church) construction begins.
 1395 - Hofje van Bakenes (almshouse) founded.
 1398 - Waalse Kerk (church) built.
 1478 - Haarlem Confraternity of the Rosary founded.
 1483 - Printing press in operation.
 1496 - Haarlem Guild of St. Luke active (approximate date).
 1559 - Roman Catholic Diocese of Haarlem established.
 1571 -  (gate) built.
 1572 - Siege of Haarlem by Spanish forces begins.
 1573 - 12 July: Spaniards in power.
 1576 - Fire.
 1577 - Population: 18,000 (approximate).
 1587 - Haarlem Academy of art established.
 1592 - Lieven de Key appointed city architect.
 1596 - City Library established.
 1599 - Weigh House built.
 1600 - Population: 30,000 (approximate).
 1603 - Vleeshal built.
 1604 - City Hall rebuilt.
 1615 - Lutherse Kerk, Haarlem built.
 1616 - Artist Frans Hals paints The Banquet of the Officers of the St George Militia Company in 1616.
 1624 - "Tax riot."
 1631 - Haarlemmertrekvaart Amsterdam-Haarlem canal created.
 1634 - Tulip mania begins.
 1637 - Tulip market collapses.
 1661 - Artist Jan Steen moves to Haarlem.
 1662 - Oprechte Haerlemsche Courant newspaper in publication.
 1677 -  (gate) built.
 1683 - Doopsgezinde kerk, Haarlem (church) built.

18th-19th centuries
 1707 - Proveniershuis (almshouse) founded.
 1719 - Onderlinge van 1719 u.a. established
 1752 - Holland Society of Sciences founded.
 1778 - Teylers Stichting (society) founded.
 1784
 Teylers Museum opens.
 Society for Public Welfare founded.
 1788 - Villa Welgelegen (residence) built.
 1794 -  (residence) built.
 1821 - Kunst zij ons doel (art group) formed.
 1832 -  erected the Haarlemmerhout park.
 1839 - Amsterdam-Haarlem railway begins operating; Haarlem railway station  opens.
 1840 - City becomes capital of North Holland province.
 1841 -  built.
 1852 - Haarlemmermeer (lake) drained.
 1862 - Gemeentelijk Museum opens.
 1863 - Droste confectionery in business.
 1865 -  established.
 1869 - Bisschoppelijk Museum founded.
 1871 - Colonial Museum opens.
 1877 - Museum van Kunstnijverheid established.
 1880 - Verweyhal built for the Trou moet Blycken society.
 1881 -  begins operating.
 1883 - Haarlems Dagblad newspaper in publication.
 1884 - Panopticon prison begins operating.
 1887 -  (bridge) built.
 1900 - Population: 65,189.

20th century

 1903 -  (bridge) built.
 1911 - 31 August: Fokker flies his aircraft "de Spin" around the tower of the Sint-Bavokerk.
 1915 -  opens.
 1918 -  opens.
 1919 - Population: 77,302.
 1922 -  housing built.
 1936 - Gemeentearchief Haarlem (city archives) moves into the Janskerk.
 1980
  festival begins.
  (cinema) opens.
 Population: 158,291 municipality.
 1995 - Jaap Pop becomes mayor.
 2000 - Population: 148,484 municipality.

21st century

 2003 - Toneelschuur theatre opens.
 2005
  (archive) headquartered in city.
  concert hall active.
 2006 - Bernt Schneiders becomes mayor.
 2009 -  (bridge) opens.
 2011 -  cinema opens.
 2013 - Population: 153,093 municipality.

See also
 Haarlem history
 
 
 
 Timelines of other municipalities in the Netherlands: Amsterdam, Breda, Delft, Eindhoven, Groningen, The Hague, 's-Hertogenbosch, Leiden, Maastricht, Nijmegen, Rotterdam, Utrecht

References

This article incorporates information from the Dutch Wikipedia.

Bibliography

in English
 
 
 
 

 

 
 
 (+ 1881 ed.)
 

in Dutch
 
 
 
 
  (fulltext)

External links

 Europeana. Items related to Haarlem, various dates.
 Digital Public Library of America. Items related to Harlem, various dates

 
Haarlem
Years in the Netherlands